The Kink Kronikles is a compilation double album by the Kinks, released on Reprise Records in 1972, after the band had signed with RCA Records in 1971. It contains thirteen non-album singles, fourteen tracks taken from five albums released by the band from 1966 to 1971 (including the UK-only Percy), and one track previously unreleased. Designed specifically for the American market, it peaked at No. 94 on the Billboard 200. The single versions and mixes were not necessarily used for each track.

Content
After the Kinks failed to renew their American distribution contract with Reprise, the label assembled this compilation without input from the band. Instead, Reprise invited rock journalist and noted Kinks fan John Mendelsohn to compile this package, ignoring the band's early trademark hits already appearing on The Kinks Greatest Hits!. Mendelsohn also contributed the liner notes.

The album contains all five singles that charted on the Billboard Hot 100 during the time period covered, two of which appeared here on album in the U.S. for the first time: "Dead End Street" and "Mr. Pleasant". "Lola" and "Apeman" were the band's first American top ten hits in over five years. Five tracks made their U.S. debut in any format here – "Berkeley Mews", "Willesden Green", "This Is Where I Belong", "Did You See His Name?" and "King Kong". "Did You See His Name?" was original to this compilation. "King Kong" would make its US single debut Reprise 1094 two months after the release of this double album.  (It had been released in 1969 in the UK and other European countries.)

Considered an exemplary compilation, the album was ranked number 232 on Rolling Stone magazine's list of the 500 greatest albums of all time, one of the few compilations to appear on the list. It became an important milestone in the Kinks' career by introducing highlights of the band's England-centered 1966-1970 period to American audiences. It was never properly remastered for compact disc; the CD track listing is identical to that on the original vinyl, placing sides one and two on disc one and sides three and four on disc two. On August 29, 2020, a remastered release was issued in digital and vinyl formats. The remastering was done by Phil Kinrade at Alchemy Mastering.

Track listing
All songs by Ray Davies except "Death of a Clown", "Mindless Child of Motherhood", and "Susannah's Still Alive" by Dave Davies. All catalogue numbers and titles US release except *UK or European release.  **Stereo debut of single previously released in mono.

Side one

Side two

Side three

Side four

References

Sources

External links
The Official Ray Davies Web Site

The Kinks compilation albums
1972 compilation albums
Reprise Records compilation albums